Virginia Dale (born Virginia Paxton; July 1, 1917 – October 3, 1994) was an American actress and dancer.

Biography
Dale was born in North Carolina. She was the daughter of Lula Helms Paxton, and she graduated from Central High School in Charlotte.

While working with her sister, Frances, to form the dancing Paxton Sisters in New York City, she was discovered by Darryl F. Zanuck who signed her to a contract with 20th Century Fox.

She appeared in a number of movies in the late 1930s and 1940s, including Holiday Inn (1942), in which she dances and sings with Fred Astaire and Bing Crosby, and she became particularly associated with musicals. In the 1950s, she worked mainly in television series such as The Adventures of Kit Carson (1951–1952), Highway Patrol (1957), and The Life and Legend of Wyatt Earp (1957–1958). She left the movie business in 1958, but returned to acting for a few films in the 1980s.

On Broadway, Dale performed in Him (1928) and The Final Balance (1928).

Dale died of complications of emphysema in Burbank, California, and is interred in Forest Lawn Memorial Park (Hollywood Hills).

Filmography

References

External links

 
 
 

1917 births
1994 deaths
20th-century American actresses
Actresses from Charlotte, North Carolina
American female dancers
American film actresses
Burials at Forest Lawn Memorial Park (Hollywood Hills)
Deaths from emphysema